Şeytan is a 1974 Turkish cult horror film that is plagiarized off of William Friedkin’s The Exorcist (1973), directed by Metin Erksan.

The film was apparently shot with a low budget, resulting in a grainy and poor image quality, and is essentially a shot-for-shot remake of The Exorcist, with only minor differences. Şeytan was out of print until 2007, when it was released in DVD.

Synopsis
Canan Perver is a 12-year-old girl named Gul, living a high society life with her mother in Istanbul, who becomes possessed by the Devil himself after experimenting with a Ouija Board.

Release

See also
 1974 in film

External links
 

1974 horror films
Films shot in Turkey
Turkish horror films
Films about exorcism
Horror film remakes
1974 films
The Devil in film
Remakes of Turkish films